Columbus Independent School District is a public school district based in Columbus, Texas (USA).

Columbus ISD serves the northern portion of Colorado County, including the city of Columbus and the communities of Frelsburg and Rock Island as well as a small portion of western Austin County that includes the community of New Ulm.

In 2009, the school district was rated "academically acceptable" by the Texas Education Agency.

Schools
Columbus High School (Grades 9-12)
Columbus Junior High School (Grades 6-8)
Columbus Elementary School (Grades PK-5)

References

External links
Columbus ISD

School districts in Colorado County, Texas
School districts in Austin County, Texas